Janelle Mae Frayna (born May 19, 1996) is a Filipina chess player. She was awarded the title of Woman Grandmaster by FIDE in 2017, becoming the first from the Philippines to achieve this. She is a 3-time and the current  Philippine Women's Chess Champion.

Early life and education
Frayna was born on May 19, 1996 in Legazpi, Albay to George and Sonia Frayna. She is the only daughter of her parents, who works as engineers, and has two brothers. She attended the Divine Word College of Legazpi, where she took her elementary and high school studies and was a consistent honor student.

Frayna entered the Far Eastern University under a scholarship which she earned on her third year in high school. In 2017, Frayna graduated with a degree of Psychology  with cum laude honors and as valedictorian.

Career
Frayna started playing chess at age 11 joining the Magayon Chess Club. She started showing interest to the sport when she was still an elementary school student. During her first two years in high school, she joined chess tournaments during City Meets as well as the Palarong Bicol and the Palarong Pambansa.

At the Philippine women's national championship, Frayna became the champion in two editions. She also finished first runner up twice in other editions of the same tournament. She also became champion for multiple times at the ASEAN Age-Group Chess Championships. After going through a six to eight months of extensive training, she enrolled at the Philippine Academy for Chess Excellence in 2010. In 2011, she won the Philippine National Juniors and became one of the youngest winners of that particular tournament.

Frayna gained the title of Woman FIDE Master in 2013 and a year later she became a Woman International Master.

The Filipino is part of the FEU Diliman Juniors Chess team. She first won over a grandmaster and an international master, both men, at the Battle of the Grandmasters tournament in July 2014, becoming the first woman to do so. She also became the first woman to qualify for the men's division of the said tournament by becoming one of six top players of the 2014 competition.

Frayna was named co-recipient of the UAAP Season 77 Athlete of the Year award after leading her university's team at the UAAP Championship, along with table tennis player Ian Lariba.

At the 42nd Chess Olympiad held in September 2016, Frayna achieved her final norm to become eligible for the title of Woman Grandmaster. After the feat, she was dubbed by the media as the Philippines' first woman grandmaster. This title was later confirmed by the Presidential Board by written resolution in early 2017.

Frayna was nominated by the National Chess Federation of the Philippines to play in the 2021 FIDE Women's World Cup in Sochi, Russia after the Philippines was given one of the 39 wild card slots for the tournament.

She took part in the 2021 Southeast Asian Games in Vietnam where she won two bronze medals; one for the women's rapid chess event and the second for the women's individual blitz.

References

External links 

1996 births
Living people
Chess woman grandmasters
Chess Olympiad competitors
Filipino female chess players
People from Legazpi, Albay
Far Eastern University alumni
Competitors at the 2021 Southeast Asian Games
Southeast Asian Games bronze medalists for the Philippines
Southeast Asian Games silver medalists for the Philippines
Southeast Asian Games medalists in chess